The Surly Brewing Company is an American craft brewery with facilities in Minneapolis and Brooklyn Center, Minnesota, and is noted for primarily canning beers, rather than bottling. Initially available only in and around the Minneapolis–Saint Paul metropolitan area, the company expanded distribution to include all of Minnesota and several nearby states. During the early 2010s, Surly experienced rapid growth, with production of 21,000 barrels in 2012, 28,000 barrels in 2013, and 47,757 barrels in 2015. Surly's brewing system in Brooklyn Center is a 30 beer barrel (BBL) Sprinkman, one of four identical systems produced by Sprinkman of Wisconsin. The Minneapolis location has a 100 barrel system. Despite sharing a similar name and being headquartered in the U.S. state of Minnesota, the brewing company and Surly Bikes are separate enterprises. An agreement between the two companies allows the bicycle manufacturer to display the single word "Surly" on its products.

History

Surly Brewing Co. founder Omar Ansari had been homebrewing since 1994. After apprenticing at New Holland Brewing Company in Michigan and enlisting Todd Haug of Minneapolis's Rock Bottom Brewery, Surly Brewing began brewing in Brooklyn Center.

In February 2011, Surly announced that it intended to open a restaurant and beer garden, which was expected to cost US$20 million. The new facility would also increase its brewing capacity to approximately 100,000 barrels. This type of installation was not in line with Minnesota's liquor laws, however. With the help of the Surly Nation, fans of the brewery's beer, some members of the Minnesota Legislature were convinced to propose changes in order to allow it. Minnesota's three-tier liquor sales system would not allow breweries to distribute their beer for retail sale and sell on the brewery's premises, as a brewpub does. After just a few months, changes to Minnesota's liquor laws that would allow Surly to sell beer for consumption at the proposed BrewPub, were passed in an omnibus liquor bill introduced by Rep. Jenifer Loon (R - Eden Prairie) and Sen. Linda Scheid (DFL - Brooklyn Park). Known as the "Surly Bill", this bill was signed into law by Governor Mark Dayton on 25 May 2011.

In 2012, Esquire magazine selected Surly Brewing Company's CynicAle 16 ounce as one of the "Best Canned Beers to Drink Now" in a February article.

Surly purchased an  plot of land in Prospect Park, Minneapolis for its $20 million brewery in April 2013. Surly secured $2 million in environmental mediation grants from Hennepin County to address more than a century's worth of accumulated industrial pollution at the site. Their new brewery and taproom opened in December 2014.

In 2016, Surly was featured on an episode of Diners, Drive-Ins and Dives, hosted by Guy Fieri.

In 2020, Surly announced it would layoff 150 employees and indefinitely close its 350-seat beer hall, pizzeria, events center, and retail store in Minneapolis. Though the company said the decision was a result of declining revenue due to restrictions during the COVID-19 pandemic, announcement of it came just days after employees announced their intention to unionize under Unite Here Local 17 that represents restaurant and hospitality workers. Some labor leaders felt the move by Surly was retaliatory and filed unfair labor practice charges. The company said sales at its on-site location were down 82% from the prior year, and it was no longer profitable. It reopened in May of 2021.

Distribution
For the first several years Surly was only available in the Minneapolis-St. Paul area due to limited supply. An initial expansion to Chicago was reversed in June 2010 to ensure they could reliably serve the brewery's home market. In November 2013, Surly re-entered the Chicago market, being offered at over one hundred different bars, restaurants, and liquor stores in the Chicago metropolitan area. This expansion included canned and kegged Surly Cynic, Hell, Bender, Overrated, and Coffee Bender, with some Chicago liquor stores carrying select Surly specialities when available. In early 2015 Surly expanded its distribution to include Iowa and also aimed to include Wisconsin by the end of the same year.

See also
 Barrel-aged beer

References

External links

 

Beer brewing companies based in Minnesota